Succinylornithine aminotransferase may refer to:
 Succinylornithine transaminase, enzyme
 Acetylornithine transaminase, enzyme